Edel Paragliders was a South Korean aircraft manufacturer based in Gwangju and headed by Sung Heon Song. The company specialized in the design and manufacture of paragliders and paramotor wings in the form of ready-to-fly aircraft.

The company seems to have been founded in the 1990s and went out of business in about 2007.

The company was a subsidiary of the Hispo Company, Limited, which manufactured parachutes for military use and was established in 1982. Hispo also appears to be out of business.

Edel produced a very large range of paragliders and at one time was one of the world's largest manufacturers of them. In the mid-2000s they had 39 paraglider models in production, plus additional wings for paramotoring. Aircraft included the competition level Edel Ace, Excel and Millennium as well as the beginner's Be All and the intermediate level Live. The company also produced two-place gliders, like the Prime Bi.

Aircraft 

Summary of paragliders built by Edel:
Edel 8000
Edel Ace
Edel Aerotik
Edel Apollo
Edel Atlas
Edel Be All
Edel Confidence
Edel Control
Edel Corvette
Edel Course
Edel Crazy
Edel Energy
Edel EQ
Edel Excel
Edel Galazy
Edel Genious
Edel Infinity
Edel Jupiter
Edel Live
Edel Manta
Edel Mercury
Edel Millenium
Edel Millennium
Edel Mountain
Edel Mustang
Edel New
Edel Orion
Edel Peacock
Edel Populair
Edel Power Atlas
Edel Prime
Edel Prime Bi
Edel Promise
Edel Quantum
Edel Racer
Edel Rainbow
Edel Response
Edel Saber
Edel Sector
Edel Sector TX
Edel Solo
Edel Space
Edel Stardust
Edel Superspace
Edel Wisdom
Edel Weekend
Edel ZX
Edel ZX Bi

References

External links
Company website archives on Archive.org

Defunct aircraft manufacturers of South Korea
Paragliders